Sekolah Menengah Sains Sembrong (abbreviated SASEM) is a fully residential school (Sekolah Berasrama Penuh) in the state of Johor, Malaysia. The school was completed and officially handed over to the Ministry of Education in April 2011. The school is widely known as SASEM.

History
Sekolah Menengah Sains Sembrong (Sembrong Secondary Science School) or SASEM for short is a newly established fully residential school in Kluang, Johor. The school was completed and officially handed over to the Ministry of Education in April 2011.

The first batch of students registered just before the year end school holidays in November 2011. They returned as Form 2 students in January 2012. Currently, there are about 500 students enrolled in the school, consisting of Form 1, Form 2 and Form 4 students. In terms of number of classes, the Form 1 and Form 2 students make up five classes each where as the Form 4 students make up seven classes.

School areas and vicinity
SASEM has two fields, one for hockey and another one for Rugby, Football and other Field Events. There are only three parking spaces in the academic block and two in the hostels, one each for the girls and the boys hostels. There are two basketball courts in the school and one big hall which has a stage with curtains and three badminton courts. There is one volleyball court each in the boys' hostel and the girls' hostel. There is an additional Sepak Takraw court in the boys' hostel. The school is also equipped with labs for every science subject (Science, Physics, Chemistry and Biology), a room each for French Language and Japanese Language, a music room, an art studio, a viewing room and also a Multimedia Studio. The rooms and the sports area are all available for students' use under teachers' supervision.

The nearest town to the school is Bandar T6, located less than five minutes to the school. Bandar T6 is a quaint little town equipped with a few grocery stores and a mosque which is where the male students go for their Friday prayers. This town is however not the place where the students go for their weekly outings, the school bus would usually bring the students for their outing to the Kluang town, located 12 km from the school. The school is also near to the Kluang Hospital, the Hospital Enche' Besar Hajjah Kalsom, where the hostel wardens would bring the sick students for treatments or check-ups.

Buildings
SASEM is a big school; the total area is more than 60 acres. The hostels can accommodate a maximum of 896 students. The school complex is divided into two areas, one area for the academic and administrative buildings and the other for the hostels. The two areas are separated by a small stream which the school cannot do anything about because it is under the jurisdiction of the Water and Drainage Department. It takes about a 10 minutes walk from the hostel to the academic building.

Principals
 En. Mohd Noh Bin Hj Mohd Yussof (2012-2014)
 Tn. Haji Mohd Shariff Bin Junidek (2014-2016)
 En. Rijaludin Bin Che Mat (2017-2020)
 En. Rozlan Bin Zulkifli (2021-recent)

Head boys and head girls

Hostels
SASEM hostels have the capacity to house 896 students. There are only two blocks, one for girls and one for boys. There are at least 56 rooms in each hostels and each room have the capacity to house 8 students. There are two restrooms in each floors. The room allocations are according to levels and houses. The prefects would get a whole floor to themselves and the rest of the students would be distributed according to their houses. Each room would consists members of the same house but different forms. It has change due to COVID-19 that each room consists of members of the same class to prevent spreadnees of the virus.

Academic achievements
Even though SASEM is a new school, but it has shown tremendous progress. The school ranked highly in SBP list for both PMR and SPM achievements in 2013. A total of 37 students acquired 9As in SPM. The best achievements on subjects are History, Pendidikan Islam and Mathematics.

In 2019, a total of 63 students successfully acquired straight As in PT3, an achievement for the school throughout the school's history. It is a record for the school's achievement for the examination currently.

Houses 
SASEM has four houses, like every other SBP in Malaysia, it follows the house system as a main culture for SBP Lifestyle. The four houses are as follows;

Co-curricular achievements

SASEM, like any other fully residential school, is very active in a lot of co-curricular activities such as sports. SASEM has a few established sporting teams like the football team which consists of both under 15 and under 18 teams. The Rugby team, which had renamed themselves as the Alpha Wolves is also very active. The Cricket and Archery teams had both been very prominent in the past two years in terms of bringing back medals. The Basketball team which had named themselves the Black Titan has been very active of late, having practices everyday and going to several open tournaments. The Netball teams named Enorfox have reached the finals in district level for two years in a row. The hockey team both boys and girls also actively participate numerous competition throughout the year. Athletics also is very actives and has proven to be one of the prominent players in the district of Kluang. In the Co-Academic section, the school has shown great results in 'Reka Cipta' and 'Kelab Pengguna'. Reka Cipta has won several National Tournaments in 2014 and 2015, proving to be one of the best Co Academic teams in SASEM.

Co-curricular teams

Niche areas

SASEM's niche area is yet to be determined

External links 
 
  - Official Facebookpage

2011 establishments in Malaysia
Educational institutions established in 2011
Co-educational boarding schools
Kluang District